Wiedemann–Steiner syndrome (WSS) is a rare genetic disorder that causes developmental delay, unusual facial features, short stature, and reduction in muscle tone (hypotonia).  The syndrome was originally described in 1989 by Hans-Rudolf Wiedemann.  The genetic basis for the syndrome was identified by Dr. Wendy D. Jones in 2012.  The first case was reported in 1989 by Wiedemann and colleagues which reported a Caucasian boy with pre- and postnatal growth deficiency, psychomotor delay, and a round and flat face, short nose, widely spaced eyes, long philtrum, short palpebral fissures, low-set ears, and high-arched palate. Other findings included an alternating convergent squint, dilatation of the renal calyces, and short and thick limbs. Later decades brought about more finding and descriptions of this disorder.

Signs and symptoms
Features described in Wiedemann–Steiner syndrome include:
 Short stature
 Developmental delay
 Low muscle tone (hypotonia) especially in infancy
 Characteristic facial features
 Hairy elbows (hypertrichosis cubiti)
Wiedemann–Steiner syndrome may be related to global developmental delays, sleeping difficulties, feeding and digestion complexities, unusual facial features, short/petite stature, hypotonia, dental issues, hairy elbows, long eyelashes, etc.

Cause
Wiedemann–Steiner syndrome results from mutations in the MLL (also known as KMT2A) gene on the long arm of chromosome 11.  The gene encodes a histone-modification enzyme — that is, it helps modify the expression of other genes. The condition is autosomal dominant, meaning that only one abnormal copy of the gene is needed for a person to have the syndrome. In a majority of cases to date, the mutation occurred de novo — that is, neither parent was affected and the mutation is sporadic. Offspring of those with WSS have a 50% chance of having WSS.

The mechanism by which mutations in the MLL gene cause the phenotype of Wiedemann–Steiner syndrome is not yet known.

Screening 
If Wiedemann–Steiner syndrome is suspected, analysis of the MLL gene can be carried out.  Otherwise, it may be diagnosed by whole-exome sequencing or whole genome sequencing.

There is limited diagnostic testing in this area. The standard screening tests that take place during pregnancy that can diagnose syndromes such as Down Syndrome do not diagnose WSS. In addition, baseline genetics diagnostic tests conducted after birth do not include testing for WSS. Whole exome sequencing has been used to identify most people with WSS. Often, medical professionals do not offer the option for whole exome testing or the costs associated are not covered by insurance or require a large copay limiting individuals from having the testing done. Frequently, patients are given other incorrect medical explanations or a less specific and broader diagnosis, like autism and Rubinstein–Taybi syndrome. Additionally, once a person reaches a certain age or phase in their lifetime having been mis-diagnosed or gone undiagnosed, he/she may stop looking for answers to their medical trials and tribulations meaning they may never come across a formal WSS diagnosis. There have also been patients with Wiedemann–Steiner syndrome who were initially mis-diagnosed with Kabuki syndrome.

Treatment
There is no specific cure or treatment for Wiedemann–Steiner syndrome.  Children with this condition may benefit from a range of supportive treatments such as physiotherapy, speech therapy, supplementary nutrition for poor feeding, and special educational support.

Those affected with Wiedemann–Steiner syndrome often receive physical, occupational, speech, feeding, and/or behavioral therapies. Hippotherapy and music therapy have also been helpful to those affected by WSS. School-aged children affected with WSS may benefit from one-on-one aides, modified instruction, and/or special day class environments.

Epidemiology
A little over 1000 people have been documented with the condition worldwide. Once thought to have an incidence of 1 in 1,000,000, some research has suggested the incidence may be as high as 1 in 40,000  The approximate number of WSS cases are seemingly low today but offspring of those with WSS have half the chance of having the disorder themselves. There’s no current evidence of life expectancy of individuals with WSS is shortened.

References

7. (Replacement)  Sheppard SE, Quintero-Rivera F. Wiedemann-Steiner Syndrome. 2022 May 26. In: Adam MP, Mirzaa GM, Pagon RA, et al., editors. GeneReviews® [Internet]. Seattle (WA): University of Washington, Seattle; 1993-2022.

8.  Koenig, R., Meinecke, P., Kuechler, A., Schäfer, D., & Müller, D. (2010). Wiedemann-Steiner syndrome: Three further cases. American Journal of Medical Genetics Part A, 152A(9), 2372–2375. https://doi.org/10.1002/ajmg.a.33587

External links 
 WIEDEMANN–STEINER SYNDROME; WDSTS
 Wiedemann–Steiner syndrome

Genetic diseases and disorders
Rare syndromes